Romania competed at the 1968 Summer Olympics in Mexico City, Mexico. 82 competitors, 66 men and 16 women, took part in 64 events in 9 sports.

Medalists

|  style="text-align:left; width:72%; vertical-align:top;"|

| style="text-align:left; width:23%; vertical-align:top;"|

Gold

 Viorica Viscopoleanu — Athletics, Women's Long Jump
 Lia Manoliu — Athletics, Women's Discus Throw
 Serghei Covaliov and Ivan Patzaichin — Canoeing, Men's C2 1000m Canadian Pairs
 Ion Drîmbă — Fencing, Men's Foil Individual

Silver
 Ileana Silai — Athletics, Women's 800 metres
 Mihaela Peneș — Athletics, Women's Javelin Throw
 Ion Monea — Boxing, Men's Light Heavyweight
 Anton Calenic, Dimitrie Ivanov, Haralambie Ivanov, and Mihai Țurcaș — Canoeing, Men's K4 1000m Kayak Fours
 Marcel Roșca — Shooting, Men's Rapid-Fire Pistol
 Ion Baciu — Wrestling, Men's Greco-Roman Bantamweight

Bronze
 Calistrat Cuțov — Boxing, Men's Lightweight
 Viorica Dumitru — Canoeing, Women's K1 500m Kayak Singles
 Ileana Gyulai-Drimba, Ana Pascu-Ene-Dersidan, Ecaterina Stahl-Iencic, Olga Szabo-Orban and Maria Vicol — Fencing, Women's Foil Team
 Simion Popescu — Wrestling, Men's Featherweight
 Nicolae Martinescu — Wrestling, Men's Greco-Roman Light Heavyweight

Athletics

Boxing

Canoeing

Cycling

One cyclist represented Romania in 1968.

Individual road race
 Emil Rusu

Individual pursuit
 Emil Rusu

Fencing

Ten fencers, five men and five women, represented Romania in 1968.

Men's foil
 Ion Drîmbă
 Mihai Țiu
 Tănase Mureșanu

Men's team foil
 Ion Drîmbă, Mihai Țiu, Ștefan Haukler, Tănase Mureșanu, Iuliu Falb

Men's épée
 Ștefan Haukler
 Tănase Mureșanu

Women's foil
 Ecaterina Stahl-Iencic
 Olga Orban-Szabo
 Ileana Gyulai-Drîmbă-Jenei

Women's team foil
 Ecaterina Stahl-Iencic, Ileana Gyulai-Drîmbă-Jenei, Olga Orban-Szabo, Ana Derșidan-Ene-Pascu, Maria Vicol

Rowing

Shooting

Twelve shooters, all men, represented Romania in 1968. Marcel Roşca won silver in the 25 m pistol.

25 m pistol
 Marcel Roşca
 Virgil Atanasiu

50 m pistol
 Neagu Bratu
 Lucian Giuşcă

300 m rifle, three positions
 Petre Șandor
 Ștefan Kaban

50 m rifle, three positions
 Nicolae Rotaru
 Ion Olărescu

50 m rifle, prone
 Nicolae Rotaru
 Marin Ferecatu

Trap
 Ion Dumitrescu
 Gheorghe Florescu

Skeet
 Gheorghe Sencovici

Swimming

Wrestling

References

Nations at the 1968 Summer Olympics
1968
1968 in Romanian sport